The Capture of Morelia took place on 30 November 1863 during the Second French intervention in Mexico. It was fought between French troops in charge of generals Berthier and Márquez and Mexican army commanded by José López Uraga.

References

Conflicts in 1863
1863 in Mexico
1863 in the French colonial empire
Battles involving France
Battles of the Second French intervention in Mexico
November 1863 events